Caradjaria is a genus of snout moths. It was described by Roesler, in 1975, and contains the species C. asiatella. It is found in China (including Shaanxi).

References

Phycitinae
Monotypic moth genera
Moths of Asia